Sebastián Alabanda Fernández (31 October 1950 – 10 June 2014) was a Spanish professional footballer who played as a midfielder.

Club career
Born in Posadas, Province of Córdoba, Alabanda spent his first eight seasons as a senior with Real Betis, except for a short loan at Rayo Vallecano. With the former club, he made his debut in La Liga on 7 September 1974, starting in a 3–1 away loss against UD Las Palmas.

In 1976–77, Alabanda contributed 20 games to help the Andalusians finish fifth whilst winning the Copa del Rey, a penalty shootout win over Athletic Bilbao where he missed his attempt after a 2–2 regulation time draw. At the end of the following campaign, however, they suffered relegation to the Segunda División.

After leaving Betis in June 1980, with competitive totals of 229 matches and 19 goals, Alabanda signed with fellow top-flight team Real Murcia. He scored three goals in his first year, but could not help prevent relegation.

International career
Alabanda earned one cap for Spain: on 24 April, he came on as a late substitute in a 1–1 friendly draw with West Germany in Madrid.

Later life and death
After retiring, Alabanda worked in banking. On 29 May 2014, he returned to Betis as a counsellor, but died in his home in Seville on 10 June, at the age of 63.

Honours
Betis
Copa del Rey: 1976–77
Segunda División: 1973–74

References

External links

1950 births
2014 deaths
Sportspeople from the Province of Córdoba (Spain)
Spanish footballers
Footballers from Andalusia
Association football midfielders
La Liga players
Segunda División players
Tercera División players
Betis Deportivo Balompié footballers
Real Betis players
Rayo Vallecano players
Real Murcia players
Spain amateur international footballers
Spain international footballers